Banur is a city and a municipal council in Patiala district  in the state of Punjab, India.

Demographics
 India census, Banur had a population of 15,005. Males constitute 54% of the population and females 46%. Banur has an average literacy rate of 61%, higher than the national average of 59.5%; with 58% of the males and 42% of females literate. 15% of the population is under 6 years of age.

References

Cities and towns in Patiala district